Suzanne Chazin is an American author best known for the Georgia Skeehan mystery series, published by Putnam, about a New York City female firefighter-turned-fire marshal and for the Jimmy Vega mystery fiction series about a homicide detective navigating the world of the undocumented, published by Kensington Books.

Biography
Suzanne Chazin was born in Manhattan, New York and is a 1982 graduate of Northwestern University. Chazin spent 18 years in journalism, writing for publications including Family Circle, The Ladies Home Journal, Money Magazine and The New York Times. She is a former senior editor and writer for Reader's Digest, where she won several national awards.

Her first novel in the Georgia Skeehan series, The Fourth Angel, was released in February 2001, followed by Flashover in 2002 and Fireplay in 2003. Her first novel in the Jimmy Vega series, "Land of Careful Shadows," was released in December 2014, followed by "A Blossom of Bright Light" in 2015 and "No Witness But the Moon" in 2016. Her novels received critical praise and have been excerpted in the New York Times. In May 2003, she received the Washington Irving Book Award for both The Fourth Angel and Flashover. In 2016, "Land of Careful Shadows" was selected among the top five mystery books of the year by the American Library Association's RUSA reading council.

Chazin has taught fiction and non-fiction writing at The New School in Manhattan, New York University, Sarah Lawrence College and The Smithsonian.

External links
Suzanne Chazin via Penguin Group
suzannechazin.com
Kensingtonbooks.com

Year of birth missing (living people)
Living people
21st-century American novelists
American mystery writers
American women novelists
Medill School of Journalism alumni
Sarah Lawrence College faculty
Women mystery writers
21st-century American women writers
Novelists from New York (state)
American women academics